tRNA pseudouridine55 synthase (TruB, aCbf5, Pus4, YNL292w (gene), Psi55 tRNA pseudouridine synthase, tRNA:Psi55-synthase, tRNA pseudouridine 55 synthase, tRNA:pseudouridine-55 synthase, Psi55 synthase, tRNA Psi55 synthase, tRNA:Psi55 synthase, tRNA-uridine55 uracil mutase, Pus10, tRNA-uridine54/55 uracil mutase) is an enzyme with systematic name tRNA-uridine55 uracil mutase. This enzyme catalyses the following chemical reaction

 tRNA uridine55  tRNA pseudouridine55

Pseudouridine synthase TruB from Escherichia coli specifically modifies uridine55 in tRNA molecules.

References

External links 
 

EC 5.4.99